This is a list of major awards and honors won by members of the Nebraska Cornhuskers baseball team, which represents the University of Nebraska–Lincoln in the Big Ten Conference of NCAA Division I. The program began play in 1889.

Nebraska has been to 19 NCAA baseball tournaments and advanced to four super regionals (2000, 2001, 2002, 2005) and three College World Series (2001, 2002, 2005). The Cornhuskers have won eight regular season conference championships (1929, 1948, 1950, 2001, 2003, 2005, 2017, 2021) and four conference tournament championships (1999–2001, 2005). They have had eighteen 40-win seasons, including nine since 1999, as well as three 50-win seasons. The Cornhuskers won the program's first Big Ten championship in 2017.

National awards

NCBWA District Player of the Year
Shane Komine – 2000
Dan Johnson – 2001
Jeff Leise – 2002
Matt Hopper – 2003
Alex Gordon – 2004, 2005
Luke Gorsett –2006

All-Americans
Nebraska has received a combined 103 All-America certificates from the ABCA, Baseball America, Baseball Weekly, Collegiate Baseball, NCBWA, Perfect Game, and Sporting News. The program has also received fifteen first-team freshman All-America certificates.

Academic All-Americans

CoSIDA Academic All-American of the Year
Jeff Leise – 2002, 2003

CoSIDA Academic All-Americans

Conference Awards

All-Big Eight

All-Big 12

All-Big Ten

See also
College baseball awards
Nebraska Cornhuskers academic honors and awards

References

Honors